The Public Choice Award for the Best Score of the Year is an award by the World Soundtrack Academy. Each year, the general public votes for the nominees and the award is presented at the annual World Soundtrack Awards. The category has existed since 2001, but there was not a winner nor a vote for 2003's ceremony.

In 2016, the International Film Music Critics Association partnered with WSA in choosing the shortlist of nominees, selecting 30 scores representing the most outstanding works. The five nominees receiving the most votes became the final candidates for the award, with the winner announced at the awards gala.

Winners
2001: Artificial Intelligence: A.I. - John Williams
2002: The Lord of the Rings: The Fellowship of the Ring - Howard Shore
2003: No award given.
2004: Harry Potter and the Prisoner of Azkaban - John Williams
2005: Alexander - Vangelis
2006: Brokeback Mountain - Gustavo Santaolalla
2007: The Fountain - Clint Mansell
2008: Aanrijding in Moscou - 
2009: Twilight - Carter Burwell
2010: A Single Man - Abel Korzeniowski
2011: 127 Hours - A. R. Rahman
2012: W.E. - Abel Korzeniowski
2013: The Butterfly's Dream - Rahman Altin
2014: Marina - Michelino Bisceglia
2015: The Maze Runner - John Paesano
2016: Carol - Carter Burwell
2017: Viceroy's House - A.R. Rahman
2018: Nostalgia - Eyquem Laurent
2019: How to Train Your Dragon: The Hidden World - John Powell
2020: Klaus - Alfonso G. Aguilar

References

External links
 Official website

World Soundtrack Awards